Marius Hubert-Robert (10 June 1885 – 15 March 1966) was a French Orientalist painter and illustrator.

Biography

Hubert-Robert was born in Paris in 1885.  He is the great-great nephew of the celebrated landscape painter Hubert Robert (22 May 1733 – 15 April 1808).  His artistic ancestry also includes Aphonse Robert (his grand father) who was the private painter of Louis Philippe I, and Jean-Francois Robert (his great-grand father, Professor of painting at the Grand Duchy of Tuscany during the Napoleonic Era.

Career 
Hubert-Robert mounted notable exhibitions at the Salon des Indépendants in 1929, at the Société des Artistes Français, at the Société Nouvelle des Beaux Arts, and at the Salon d'Hiver.

As a painter in the 10th Army during World War I, Hubert-Robert donated two of his war paintings to the Musée du Luxembourg.

Among his principal exhibitions are:
 Paris, Galerie Charpentier "De l'Alaska à la Terre de Feu"(1926); "Sous le signe du Soleil, Afrique du Nord" (1928); "Le Bassin Méditerranéen" (1931); Galerie Petit, Hôtel de la Duchesse de Rohan, Galerie Mona Lisa à Paris;
 London: The Mansion House, Alpin Club;
 United States: New York, Washington, Boston, Philadelphia, New Orleans, Chicago, Detroit, San Francisco, Los Angeles, Portland, Seattle, Cleveland, Buffalo;
 Canada: Québec, Montréal, Ottawa, Toronto, Winnipeg, Calgary, Edmonton, Vancouver, Victoria;
 Brazil: Rio de Janeiro;
 Argentina: Buenos Aires, Rosario de Santa Fe
 Other: Athens, Zurich, Munich, Algiers, and Beyrouth.

All of these exhibitions were at the invitation of the local French ambassadors and consuls.

Hubert-Robert was sponsored by the Astor family for a decade, allowing him to travel extensively, notably to the United States and Canada, but also to Africa (Morocco and Egypt), Greece and Indochina. He also worked with the magazine L'Illustration (circa 1930 - 1938).

Work 

 Women and Children at the Well of FRÉMIGNY, 1776
 Vue du Maroc, [View of Morocco], date unknown
 Caprice architectural avec ruines antiques, [Caprice architecture with ancient ruins], date unknown
 City of Paris, 1880
 Downtown San Francisco 1880
 Normandy Scene, date unknown
 Scène de rue animée, [Animated street scene], date unknown
 La Kasbah de Khénifra,'' [Kasbah at Khénifra], date unknown

See also
 List of Orientalist artists
 Orientalism

References 

19th-century French painters
Orientalist painters
1885 births
1966 deaths
20th-century French painters